State Road 812 (SR 812) is a short west–east state highway located north of Belle Glade, Palm Beach County, Florida. Known as Hooker Highway, it forms a portion of a truck bypass around Belle Glade. It connects with SR 715 at its western terminus and with US 98, US 441, SR 15, and SR 80 at its eastern terminus. The highway is a two-lane road and was named in honor of Walter R. Hooker.

Route description 
Hooker Highway's western terminus is at SR 715. The road travels mostly through rural farmland, especially to its north. To its south is a Palm Beach County water treatment facility and the Lakeland Medical Center, which is farther east. As the highway approaches its eastern terminus, it passes Livestock Market Road and a railroad crossing before concluding at an intersection with US 98, US 441, SR 15, and SR 80.

History 
Hooker Highway is named after Walter R. Hooker, a farmer and businessman who moved to the Everglades in 1920 and was a member of the Palm Beach County Planning and Zoning Board. The road was named after him at the request of Commissioner Paul Rardin, who was a county commissioner between the mid-1940s and the mid-1960s. 

Hooker Highway is a two-lane road, though a proposal had been made in 1969 to expand it to four as part of a seven-point road improvement program. In 2008, Palm Beach County transferred the road to the Florida Department of Transportation to create a truck bypass, which also uses SR 715 south of SR 812. A similar proposal had been made in 1988 for SR 715 and Hooker Highway to be used as a truck bypass.

Major intersections

References

External links

812
812